The 1972 Allan Cup was the Canadian senior ice hockey championship for the 1971–72 senior "A" season.  The event was hosted by the Spokane Jets and Spokane, Washington with Kimberley, British Columbia.  The 1972 playoff marked the 64th time that the Allan Cup has been awarded. The event was an international series between the Spokane Jets American team and the Barrie Flyers Canadian team.

Teams
Barrie Flyers (Eastern Canadian Champions)
Spokane Jets (Western Canadian Champions)

Best-of-seven series

Spokane wins the series 4–2

References

External links
Allan Cup archives 
Allan Cup website

Allan Cup